The P-270 Moskit is a Soviet supersonic ramjet powered anti-ship cruise missile. Its GRAU designation is 3M80, air launched variant is the Kh-41 and its NATO reporting name is SS-N-22 Sunburn (one of two missiles with that designation). The missile system was designed by the Raduga Design Bureau during the 1970s as a follow up to the P-120 Malakhit (NATO reporting name "SS-N-9 Siren"). The Moskit was originally designed to be ship-launched, but variants have been adapted to be launched from land (modified trucks), underwater (submarines) and air (reportedly the Sukhoi Su-33, a naval variant of the Sukhoi Su-27), as well as on the Lun-class ekranoplan. The missile can carry conventional and nuclear warheads. The exact classification of the missile is unknown, with varying types reported. This uncertainty is due to the secrecy surrounding an active military weapon. The missile has been purchased and exported to the People's Liberation Army Navy (China) and Egyptian Navy (Egypt).

Design

This speed is 4.25 to 3 times more than speed of the subsonic American Harpoon. The Moskit was designed to be employed against smaller NATO naval groups in the Baltic Sea (Danish and German) and the Black Sea (Turkish) and non-NATO vessels in the Pacific (Japanese, South Korean, etc.), and to defend the Russian mainland against NATO amphibious assault. The missile can perform intensive anti-defense maneuvers with overloads in excess of 10g, which completed for  before the target.

Variants of the missile have been designated 3M80M, 3M82 (Moskit M). The P-270 designation is believed to be the initial product codename for the class of missile, with the Russian Ministry of Defense GRAU indices (starting with 3M) designating the exact variant of the missile. The 3M80 was its original model. The 3M80M model (also termed 3M80E for export) was a 1984 longer range version of the missile, with the latest version with the longest range being the 3M82 Moskit M. The ASM-MSS / Kh-41 variant is the 1993 air-launched version of the missile.

The 3M80MVE variant has an optional longer  range through a second, high-altitude flight profile setting, however using the higher altitude profile would make the missile detectable at much greater distances.

Specifications

Launch range:
min: 
Maximum firing range:

3M80 –  (surface ship);  (aircraft)

3M80E –  (surface ship)

3M80MVE –  (surface ship, low-altitude trajectory);  (surface ship, combined trajectory)

Missile flight speed: 
Missile cruising altitude: 10 – 20 m (low-altitude trajectory), under 7 m for the attack at the target.
Launch sector relative to ship’s lateral plane, ang.deg: ±60
Launch readiness time:
From missile power-on till first launch: 50 seconds
From combat-ready status: 11 seconds
 Inter-missile launch time (in a salvo): 5 seconds
Launch weight:
3M-80E missile 
3M-80E1 missile 
Warhead type: penetrator
Warhead weight: 300 kg (explosives 150)
Dimensions:
Length: 9.385 m
Body diameter: 0.8 m
Wing span: 2.1 m
Folded wing/empennage span: 1.3 m

Variants 
 P-80 Zubr (with missile 3M80) shorter dimensions and range.
 P-270 Moskit (with missile 3M82) longer range and dimensions, maybe faster.
 Kh-41 air launched AGM (air-to-ground missile) or AShM (anti-ship missile).
 P-270MV Coastal Anti-Ship, GLCM (ground launch cruise missile), LACM (land attack cruise missile) variants,  SSC-7/12 .
 P-270MVE export version.

Operators 
  is the main user, under VMF, GLCM in coastal missile defence (raketnjy berezhnjy\govaja okhrana), ALCM in VVS
 
  Used on P-32 Molniya class missile boat
 
 
 
 
  (unknown)

Former operators

Notes

References

External links 
FAS report 
Global Security report
Moskit Online Photoalbum from BSF
DTIG.org report (PDF)
"Asia’s Advanced Precision Guided Munitions" (PDF)
Missile analysis (PDF)
Start from the plane for a combined trajectory (concept of combat employment). (Ru)

Weapons of Russia
 
Nuclear cruise missiles of Russia
P-270
P-270
Ramjet engines
Surface-to-surface missiles
Cruise missiles of Russia
MKB Raduga products
Military equipment introduced in the 1980s